Puntland Post is an online publication and weekly newspaper based in Garowe, the administrative capital of the autonomous Puntland region in northeastern Somalia.

History

Puntland Post was established in 2001 by Somali expatriates in Denmark. Its website publishes daily local and regional news reports and analysis in both Somali and English, with an emphasis on Somalian affairs. Puntland Post also publishes a weekly newspaper in Somali language. Puntland Post has launched a monthly English language webzine called Puntland Post Monthly.

See also
Media of Somalia

References

External links
Puntland Post

Mass media in Somalia
Mass media in Garowe
Mass media companies of Somalia
2001 establishments in Somalia
Newspapers published in Somalia
Somali-language newspapers